Rees Jones (born September 16, 1941) is an American golf course architect.

Life and career
Born and raised in Montclair, New Jersey, the son of legendary golf course designer Robert Trent Jones and the younger brother of golf course designer Robert Trent Jones, Jr., he attended Montclair High School.

His first exposure to golf course design came as a boy when he would accompany his father surveying courses.  After attending Yale and graduate studies at Harvard University Graduate School of Design, he joined his father and older brother at Robert Trent Jones Incorporated.  He helped his father on numerous courses until forming his own firm in 1974. He has designed, renovated, or restored over 260 golf courses in his career.

Jones continues to design courses and currently lives in Juno Beach, Florida and has his offices in Montclair, New Jersey.  Jones has earned the moniker “The Open Doctor” for his work in preparation for numerous major championships. He has also served as the president of the American Society of Golf Course Architects.  A noted environmentalist, he has been a vocal champion for the cause of environmentally friendly golf courses. 

Jones received the 2004 Old Tom Morris Award from the Golf Course Superintendents Association of America, GCSAA's highest honor.

Golf Course Design
Rees Jones founded the golf course design firm of Rees Jones, Inc., located in his hometown of Montclair, New Jersey in 1974. He was later joined by golf course architect Keith Evans. In 1984 Greg Muirhead (ASGCA) joined the team followed by Steve Weisser (ASGCA) in 1991 and Bryce Swanson (ASGCA) in 2000.

Courses designed

With Robert Trent Jones Incorporated
Montauk Downs, Long Island, New York (1968)
Ocean Pines, Maryland(1971)
Turnberry Isle, Florida (1972)

With Rees Jones Incorporated

 El Caballero Country Club, Tarzana, California (2021 Redesign) Originally designed by Robert Trent Jones in 1964

Arcadian Shores, Myrtle Beach, South Carolina (1974)
Graysburg Hills Golf Course [Chuckey, Tennessee] (1978)
 Bear Creek, Hilton Head Island, SC (1980)
 Black Hawk Country Club, Richmond, TX (1999)
 Marriott's Griffin Gate, Lexington, Kentucky (1981)
Haig Point Club, Daufuskie Island, South Carolina (1986)
Pinehurst #7, Pinehurst, North Carolina (1986)
Carmel Country Club, South Course Charlotte, North Carolina (1988, 2009) - redesign
The Country Club, Brookline, Massachusetts (1988) - restoration
Cherry Valley Country Club, Skillman, New Jersey (1991)
Duke University Golf Course, Durham, North Carolina (1993, 2021) - renovation
Talamore Golf Resort, Southern Pines, North Carolina (1991)
Gleneagles at the Equinox, Manchester, Vermont (1992) - reconstruction
Atlantic, Bridgehampton, New York (1992)
Sandpines, Florence, Oregon (1992)
Huntsville, Wilkes-Barre, Pennsylvania (1994)
LPGA International Champions, Daytona Beach, Florida (1994)
Legend Trail, Scottsdale, Arizona (1995)
Ocean Forest, Sea Island, Georgia (1995)
Atlanta Athletic Club - Highlands Course, Duluth, Georgia (1995) - redesign
East Lake Golf Club, Atlanta, Georgia (1995) - reconstruction
Ballantyne Country Club, Charlotte, North Carolina (1995)
Poppy Ridge, Livermore, California (1996)
Lake Merced Golf Club, Daly City, California (1996) - reconstruction
The Currituck Club, Corolla, North Carolina (1996)
Charlie Yates Golf Course, Atlanta, Georgia (1998)
Greenville Country Club (Chanticleer), Greenville, SC (2002) - redesign
Royal Oaks Golf Club, Moncton New Brunswick, Canada (2000)
Old Chatham Golf Club, Durham, North Carolina (2001)
Torrey Pines Golf Course, La Jolla, California (2001) - reconstruction
The Golf Club at Briar's Creek, Johns Island, South Carolina (2002) - Golf Digest's voted Best New Private Course in America
Quintero Golf Club(Founders Course) Peoria, Arizona (2002) 
The Oconee, Reynolds Plantation, Greensboro, Georgia (2002)
Baker Hill, Newbury, New Hampshire (2003) - Golf Digest's voted Best Course in New Hampshire
Breakers Hotel Rees Jones Course, West Palm Beach, Florida (2004) - reconstruction
Royal Montreal Golf Course, Blue Course (2004)
Bellerive Country Club, St. Louis, Missouri  (2006) - reconstruction
Cog Hill Golf & Country Club Dubsdread Course No. 4 Lemont, Illinois - restoration
Oakland Hills Country Club, Bloomfield Hills, Michigan, South Course
Baton Rouge Country Club, Baton Rouge, Louisiana - reconstruction
Stoney Creek Golf Course, Nellysford, Virginia - 27 holes
Broad Run Golfer's Club, West Bradford Township, Pennsylvania
Grand Niagara Rees Jones Course, Niagara Falls, Ontario, Canada
Lakewood Country Club, Rockville, Maryland
Golden Horseshoe Golf Club - Green Course, Williamsburg, Virginia
Red Stick, Vero Beach, Florida
The Lambton Golf and Country Club, Toronto, Ontario, Canada
Piedmont Driving Club, Atlanta, Georgia (2000)
Santaluz, San Diego, California
Golden Hills Golf Club, Ocala, Florida - redesign
Waldorf Astoria Golf Club, Orlando, Florida (2009)
Falcon's Fire Golf Club, Kissimmee, Fl
Blackstone National Golf Club, Sutton, MA
 Hell's Point Golf Club, Virginia Beach, VA (1982)
Greenbrier Country Club, Chesapeake, VA (1987)
Honey Bee Golf Club, Virginia Beach, VA (1988)
Bethpage State Park, Black Course, Farmingdale, NY (2015) - design changes
Charleston National Golf Club, Mount Pleasant, SC
Club at Viniterra, New Kent, VA (2009)

References

External links
ASGCA Architect's Gallery - Rees Jones entry
Rees Jones Golf Course Design
Rees Jones Biography
San Diego Golf Course designed by Rees Jones
American Society of Golf Course Architects profile

Golf course architects
American environmentalists
Harvard Graduate School of Design alumni
1941 births
Living people
Montclair High School (New Jersey) alumni
People from Montclair, New Jersey
Yale University alumni